Krystyna Dąbrowska (26 November 1906 – 1 September 1944) was a Polish sculptor and painter, and a Warsaw Uprising insurgent. Her work was part of the sculpture event in the art competition at the 1936 Summer Olympics.

She studied at National Artistic School in Poznań (1925–1930), Academy of Fine Arts in Warsaw (1933–1935) and Royal Academy of Fine Arts in Rome. She was a member of Polish Association of Artists - "The Capitol". Most of her works were destroyed during the Second World War. She died in the Warsaw Uprising.

Bibliography

References

External links 
 

1906 births
1944 deaths
20th-century Polish painters
20th-century Polish women artists
20th-century Polish sculptors
Academy of Fine Arts in Warsaw alumni
Home Army members
Modern sculptors
Polish female soldiers
Warsaw Uprising insurgents
Polish civilians killed in World War II
Resistance members killed by Nazi Germany
Olympic competitors in art competitions
Artists from Warsaw
Female resistance members of World War II